The Journal of Radiation Research is a bimonthly peer-reviewed scientific journal covering research on radiation and oncology. It was established in 1960 and is published by Oxford University Press. Its editor-in-chief is Kenshi Komatsu (University of Kyoto).

It is an affiliated journal of the Japan Radiation Research Society and the Japanese Society for Radiation Oncology. In 1998 the journal absorbed the Japanese Society for Radiation Oncology's former title, the Journal of JASTRO. This extended the scope of the journal to include medical and oncology research.

Abstracting and indexing 
The journal is abstracted and indexed in:
 Chemical Abstracts Service
 Index Medicus/MEDLINE/PubMed
 Science Citation Index Expanded
 Current Contents/Life Sciences
 BIOSIS Previews
 Scopus

According to the Journal Citation Reports, the journal has a 2019 impact factor of 2.014. 5 year Impact Factor 2.063

References

External links 
 

Radiology and medical imaging journals
Oxford University Press academic journals
English-language journals
Bimonthly journals
Publications established in 1960
Radioactivity